Team Murray (known as Pirtek Team Murray) is an Australian racing team that competed in the 100th running of the Indianapolis 500. The team ran the full month of May 100th Anniversary celebrations, including the Verizon IndyCar Series Angie's List Grand Prix of Indianapolis.

History
Team Murray is an American-Australian collaboration. Team owner, Brett "Crusher" Murray is an Australian motorsport public relations specialist based on the Gold Coast who has extensive experience in the American open-wheel racing market. Team Murray was operated by KV Racing Technology – a team based in Indiana owned by Australian, Kevin Kalkhoven, 1996 IndyCar World Champion, Jimmy Vasser, and James "Sulli" Sullivan. It operated a one-car operation for Sébastien Bourdais and won the 2013 Indianapolis 500 with Tony Kanaan.

For the 2016 Indianapolis 500, the car was driven by Matthew Brabham, who made history when he placed the Brabham name alongside that of Vukovich and Andretti as the only families to have had three generations start the Indy 500. Matthew's grandfather, Jack Brabham started the 500 on four occasions and his father, Geoff – who finished a best placing of fourth in his 10 attempts. For the 500, the major sponsor for the team will be Pirtek USA. Pirtek was founded in Australia in 1980 and expanded into the United States in 1996. The American arm used the Indianapolis 500 program to promote its on-site hydraulic and industrial hose service – as well as its unique franchising system. Pirtek is aiming to double its footprint in the United States in a short period of time.

The team hosted 500 members of the military and first responder community throughout the month of May in its hospitality area. The foundation used the platform of the world's biggest single day sporting event to raise awareness for its programming within those service and veteran communities. The entry into the Tag Heuer Pit Stop Challenge on Miller Lite Carb Day consisted of military veterans and first responders, coming together under the tutelage of PitFit Training for ten days to train them in being a professional pit crew.

Taya Kyle – wife of the late Chris Kyle and author of The New York Times best-selling memoir, American Wife, was the team's Official Ambassador. In her role as Executive Director of the Chris Kyle Frog Foundation, Taya personally selected the members of the CK Crew and had been central to engaging military and first responder units to be part of the program. As well as Kyle, Vern Schuppan, a former racing driver who finished third in the Indianapolis 500 in Geoff Brabham's debut year served as an ambassador for the team.

Complete IndyCar Series results
(key)

External links
 

IndyCar Series teams
Australian auto racing teams
Auto racing teams established in 2016